Alicia Hernández (born 14 August 1990) is a Mexican karateka. She won the silver medal in the women's kumite -50 kg event at the 2019 Pan American Games held in Lima, Peru. In the final, she lost against Shannon Nishi of the United States.

In 2018, she won the silver medal in the women's kumite -50 kg event at the Central American and Caribbean Games held in Barranquilla, Colombia.

In 2021, she competed at the World Olympic Qualification Tournament held in Paris, France hoping to qualify for the 2020 Summer Olympics in Tokyo, Japan. She was eliminated in her third match by Alexandra Recchia of France.

Achievements

References 

Living people
1990 births
Place of birth missing (living people)
Mexican female karateka
Pan American Games medalists in karate
Pan American Games silver medalists for Mexico
Medalists at the 2019 Pan American Games
Karateka at the 2019 Pan American Games
Competitors at the 2018 Central American and Caribbean Games
Central American and Caribbean Games silver medalists for Mexico
Central American and Caribbean Games medalists in karate
21st-century Mexican women